The Sindh Muslim Government Law College (Urdu:  سنده مسلم گورنمنٹس لا کالج) or S. M. Law College (Urdu: ایس ایم لاء کالج) is one of the oldest law schools of Pakistan, situated in Karachi, Sindh. The college has produced numerous notables including Chief Justices of Pakistan, Chief Justices of Federal Shariat Court, Chief Ministers of Sindh, Federal Ministers, and many judges of the Supreme Court of Pakistan and Sindh High Court.

The college was established by its first Principal Hassanally A. Rahman, a leading Advocate of Sindh on the June 28, 1947 and was affiliated to the University of Sindh. It started functioning at Sindh-Madrasa-tul-Islam. After the closure of Shahani Law College, the college shifted to its present building in 1948 and is affiliated with the University of Karachi.

Library
The college has one of the oldest law library in Pakistan. The library is an important resource centre, primarily intended to provide undergraduate and postgraduate students with the books, law journals and reading materials they need for their studies, as well as having a valuable and ever increasing collection of legal works. The library contains over 50,000 volumes, the core of which is a comprehensive range of legal materials for practitioners, law students and faculty members.

Former faculty
Justice Syed Ali Aslam Jafri (principal from 2019 to 2021)
Justice Haziqul Khairi (principal from 1981 to 1988)
Zulfikar Ali Bhutto (former President and Prime Minister of Pakistan)

Alumni

Indian Jurists 
 Ram Jethmalani (Doyen of criminal law)

Chief Justices of Pakistan
 Syed Sajjad Ali Shah
 Saeeduzzaman Siddiqui
 Gulzar Ahmed

Chief Justice of the Federal Shariat Court
 Haziq-ul-Khairi 
 Mir Hazar Khan Khoso
 Agha Rafiq Ahmed Khan

Supreme Court of Pakistan judges
 Tufail Ali Abdul Rehman
 Wajihuddin Ahmed
 Faisal Arab

Sindh High Court judges
 Majida Rizvi
 Syed Ghous Ali Shah
 Zafar Hussain Mirza
 Omar Sial

Other notable persons
 Makhdoom Ali Khan – Senior Advocate Supreme Court, former Attorney General of Pakistan and chairman Pakistan Bar Council
 Syed Qaim Ali Shah – Chief Minister of Sindh
 Rana Muhammad Akram Khan, former Chairman Punjab Bar Council.
 Ghous Ali Shah – former Chief Minister of Sindh, former Defence Minister of Pakistan, former Federal Education Minister
 Shahida Jamil – former Federal Minister for Women Development, former Minister for Law, Human Rights, Social Welfare and Environment
 Naimatullah Khan – former Mayor of Karachi
 Nisha Rao - lawyer and transgender activist
 Farooq H. Naik – Chairman of the Senate of Pakistan, former Federal Minister for Law and Human Rights
 Farman Fatehpuri – eminent scholar of Urdu language and literature
 Khalid Ali Z. Qazi – former Education Minister of Sindh, former Additional Advocate General of Sindh. Currently the Vice Chancellor of Shaheed Zulfiqar Ali Bhutto University of Law.
 Rasul Bux Palejo – senior politician

See also 
 List of colleges in Karachi
 Education in Pakistan

References

External links 
 Official website

Universities and colleges in Karachi
Public universities and colleges in Sindh
Law schools in Pakistan
Sindh Muslim Law College